The beaked blind snake (Anilios waitii), also known commonly as Waite's blind snake, is a species of snake in the family Typhlopidae.

Etymology
The specific name, waitii, is in honor of English-born Australian zoologist Edgar Ravenswood Waite.

Geographic range
A. waitii is endemic to Western Australia.

Habitat
The preferred natural habitats of A. waitii are grassland, shrubland, and savanna.

Reproduction
A. waitii is oviparous.

References

Further reading
Boulenger GA (1895). "On a new Typhlops previously confounded with Typhlops unguirostris, Peters". Proceedings of the Linnean Society of New South Wales, Second Series 9: 718–719. (Typhlops waitii, new species).
Cogger HG (2014). Reptiles and Amphibians of Australia, Seventh Edition. Clayton, Victoria, Australia: CSIRO Publishing. xxx + 1,033 pp. . (Ramphotyphlops waitii, p. 812).
Hedges SB, Marion AB, Lipp KM, Marin J, Vidal N (2014). "A taxonomic framework for typhlopid snakes from the Caribbean and other regions (Reptilia, Squamata)". Caribbean Herpetology (49): 1-61. (Anilios waitii, new combination).
Wallach V (2006). "The Nomenclatural Status of Australian Ramphotyphlops (Serpentes: Typhlopidae)". Bulletin of the Maryland Herpetological Society 42 (1): 8-24. (Austrotyphlops waitii, new combination, p. 13).
Wilson, Steve; Swan, Gerry (2013). A Complete Guide to Reptiles of Australia, Fourth Edition. Sydney: New Holland Publishers. 522 pp. .

Anilios
Reptiles described in 1895
Taxa named by George Albert Boulenger
Snakes of Australia